The Right of Nations to Self-Determination is a work by Vladimir Lenin written in February–May 1914.

It dealt with the national question in relation to countries such as Norway and Poland.

A polemic against Rosa Luxemburg, it was written in the vein of "The Awakening in the East."

See also
Vladimir Lenin bibliography
The National Question and Autonomy

References

External links
The Right of Nations to Self-Determination by Vladimir Lenin at the Marxists Internet Archive

1914 non-fiction books
Communist books
Works by Vladimir Lenin